Alphons Joseph is a music director and playback singer in the Malayalam film industry who got a break as a film music composer after composing for the film Vellithira. Alphons is also noted for singing the famous song "Aaromale" from the film Vinnaithaandi Varuvaayaa, which was composed by A. R. Rahman.

Personal life and early career

Alphons was born in Kaachery near Nadathara, Thrissur, Kerala, India to a musically affluent Christian family. His mother was Thankamma and father was Koladi Joseph, a tablist and a singer but by profession, a KSEB sub-engineer. Alphons was the second among their 7 children. His elder brother, Joemon is a pianist and has composed music for two Malayalam films. His younger brother Paulson is a well known exponent of Sitar and has got First Rank in M.A. Hindustani from Dharwad University. He was introduced to Music by his father's younger brother K. K. Paul, who was a well known violinist. Alphons considers Philip, another talented musician from Thrissur, as his mentor and guru. He was the one who diverted Alphons to Western Classical Music and ghazals.

Alphons has had professional training in Carnatic music from Shri. Mangad K. Nadesan (A. I. R) and has secured 7th grade in classical guitar  and 7th Grade in Western Music Theory from London Trinity College of Music. He took up music as a profession after he received the Kala Prathibha award by Calicut University for the years 1990 and 1992.

He is the lead guitarist, vocalist and one among the founders of Rexband, a gospel music band with a few albums to their credit. This band experimented a lot in gospel music by blending Western music with Hindustani and Carnatic. They have listeners all over the world and the only Asian Band, which got a chance to participate in World Youth Day. From 2000 onwards, he started working as a composer and a sound engineer in Asia-net Radio 657AM, a radio station in Dubai. He worked there even after the release of his first film soundtrack and composed many jingles and title songs as part of his work. Apart from his Master's Degree in computer application from IGNOU, he completed his M.A. in Music from Calicut university. He was a permanent judge in the Reality Show Amrita TV Superstar 2. He was also a part of A. R. Rahman's JaiHo Concert – The Journey Home.

Career

As a music director
Alphons was introduced to director Bhadran, who was looking for a new music director for his movie Vellithira, by Leo Thadevus, a friend of Alphons, who himself later on became a film director. The audio release function of Vellithira was held with several film personalities participating in the grand function including composer A. R. Rahman who appreciated Alphons for the good orchestration of the songs. The songs especially "Hridayasakhi" and "Nee Manimukiladakal" won him immediate attention. "Kera Nirakal" from Alphons' next film Jalotsavam was a super hit and won him critical accolades. The next superhit from Alphons came with Amal Neerad directed movie Big B in which the songs "Vida Parayukayano" sung by Shreya Ghoshal and "Muthu Mazha" got high acclaims.

As a playback singer
Alphons had sung some songs by his Rexband and some film songs which had music created by him. But in 2010, Alphons got a big break as a singer for singing "Aaromale", a song composed by Academy Award winner A. R. Rahman in the acclaimed soundtrack for the Tamil film Vinnaithaandi Varuvaayaa. The film as well as the song became a huge success in Kerala, Tamil Nadu and overseas and the composer called his rendition "soulful". Alphons is now a part of the Jai Ho Concert- The Journey Home World Tour by A.R.Rahman. Recently he sang a song "Nee Yeppa pulla Solla ppora" for the movie "Kumki" music by D Imman. Another song called "Engo Oodugindrai" from the movie "Pizza", music by Santhosh Narayanan. Next one was "Yarukkum Thozhanillei" from the movie "Thanka meengal", music by Yuvan Shankar Raja. He has sung the Malayalam portion of the song "Chellena oru mazhai thuli" from the movie "Raja Rani" and he himself wrote the malayalam lyrics for that song and music was composed by G V Prakash. He continues to sing in Tamil film industry for many other music directors. His recent malayalam rendition in Bijibal's music direction for the movie Rajamma@Yahoo got special appreciation and the song titled as "Mananivalude" was a khavali song.

As a Teacher
Alphons is also a teacher and the Managing Director of his own music school Crossroads School of Music. There are two branches of this music school - one in Pathadipalam and the other in Panampilly Nagar.

Discography

Playback singer

Other works
 2010 Commonwealth Games Theme song (Kerala State version)
 2011 Composed music for Medical research project Music for the foetus.

Awards and recognitions
 Alphons was awarded the 2004 Film Critics Award for the song Kera Nirakal from the movie Jalolsavam.
 2011 Amrita TV FEFKA Film Awards – Best Music Director award for the songs of the movie "Atmakadha".
 2011 Vijay TV Music Awards – Best Debut Singer award for the song Aaromale.
 2011 L-Channel Film & TV Awards – Best Music Director award for the songs of "Cocktail".
 2011 Pala Communications Yuva Prathibha Awards – For all the achievements in the year 2010.
 2011 Radio mirchi music Awards – Best Singer Nomination for VTV Song Aaromale.
 [Veteran Malayalam song composer Raveendran commented about Alphons that he is 'a composer to watch out for'.

External links
 
 
 Joseph, Alphons at the Malayalam Movie Database
 Profile of Alphons Joseph

Living people
1973 births
Malayalam film score composers
Malayalam playback singers
Malayali people
Indian music educators
Musicians from Thrissur
Tamil playback singers
St. Thomas College, Thrissur alumni
Film musicians from Kerala
21st-century Indian composers
Indian male film score composers
21st-century Indian male singers
21st-century Indian singers